Rebecca Twigg (born March 26, 1963) is an American former racing cyclist.

Cycling career

An academic prodigy, she enrolled at the University of Washington in Seattle at the age of 14 and rode for the school's team. US national team coach Eddie Borysewicz saw her and invited her to join his team when she was 17. She earned degrees in biology and computer science from UW.

Twigg won six world track cycling championships in the individual pursuit. She also won 16 US championships (the first – the individual time trial – when she was 18) and two Olympic medals, the silver medal in the 1984 road race in Los Angeles, and a bronze medal in the pursuit in Barcelona in 1992.

She won the first three editions of the Women's Challenge on the road. 

Twigg was a three-time Olympian (1984, 1992, and 1996). However, her final Olympic appearance, in Atlanta in 1996, ended in controversy when she quit the team in a disagreement with the coach Chris Carmichael and the U.S. Cycling Federation. The federation had invested in the development of the so-called SuperBike. Twigg, after using the bike earlier in the Games, refused to ride it, citing poor individual fit and claiming that pressure from the staff on her to use the SuperBike and their refusal to grant accreditation to her personal coach, Eddie Borysewicz, left her defocused.

Twigg married Mark Whitehead – a fellow member of the 1984 US Olympic cycling team – in 1985, but the marriage only lasted a couple of years.

Post-cycling life

After retiring from competitive cycling, Twigg earned an associate degree in computer science and worked at various jobs in the information technology industry. She remarried and had a daughter with her second husband. She later quit her jobs and became homeless while staying in Seattle, and as of 2019 has been homeless for the past five years. Her first personal encounter with homelessness occurred when she was 15 years old and was kicked out of her house by her mother.

Palmarès

1982
1st UCI Track Cycling World Championships (individual pursuit)
1st U.S. National Time Trial Championships
3rd United States National Road Race Championships
1983
3rd Coors Classic
1984
1st UCI Track Cycling World Championships (individual pursuit)
1st United States National Road Race Championships
1st Women's Challenge
1985
1st UCI Track Cycling World Championships (individual pursuit)
1st Women's Challenge
1986
2nd UCI Track Cycling World Championships (individual pursuit)
1st Women's Challenge
1987
1st UCI Track Cycling World Championships (individual pursuit)
1993
1st UCI Track Cycling World Championships (individual pursuit)
1st U.S. National Time Trial Championships
1994
1st U.S. National Time Trial Championships
1995
1st UCI Track Cycling World Championships (individual pursuit)
1997
3rd U.S. National Time Trial Championships

References

External links
"Free Wheeling: Rebecca Twigg Has Never Pedaled With The Pack, And She Doesn't Plan To Start Now," Sports Illustrated July 26, 1996

1963 births
Living people
American female cyclists
Cyclists at the 1984 Summer Olympics
Cyclists at the 1992 Summer Olympics
Cyclists at the 1996 Summer Olympics
Cyclists at the 1987 Pan American Games
Homelessness in the United States
Sportspeople from Seattle
UCI Track Cycling World Champions (women)
Olympic bronze medalists for the United States in cycling
Olympic silver medalists for the United States in cycling
Medalists at the 1984 Summer Olympics
Medalists at the 1992 Summer Olympics
Pan American Games gold medalists for the United States
Pan American Games medalists in cycling
American track cyclists
Medalists at the 1987 Pan American Games
21st-century American women
Cyclists from Washington (state)
University of Washington alumni